Chanoclavine, also known as chanoclavin-l is a tri-cyclic ergot alkaloid (ergoline) isolate of certain fungi. It is mainly produced by members of the genus claviceps. Long used in traditional Chinese medicine, it was found in 1987 mouse studies to stimulate dopamine D2 receptors in the brain.

See also
 Chanoclavine II
 Chanoclavine-I dehydrogenase

References

Ergolines